Agnostopelma is a genus of Colombian tarantulas that was first described by F. Pérez-Miles & D. Weinmann in 2010.<ref name=Pére2010>{{cite journal| last1=Pérez-Miles| first1=F.| last2=Weinmann| first2=D.| year=2010| title=Agnostopelma: a new genus of tarantula without a scopula on leg IV (Araneae: Theraphosidae: Theraphosinae)| journal=Journal of Arachnology| pages=104–112| volume=38| doi=10.1636/A07-60.1| s2cid=56194882| url=https://www.biodiversitylibrary.org/part/229195}}</ref>  it contains two species, found in Colombia: Agnostopelma gardel and Agnostopelma tota''.

See also
 List of Theraphosidae species

References

Theraphosidae genera
Spiders of South America
Theraphosidae